Walter Mapplebeck (19 July 1914 – 27 April 1992) was a New Zealand cricketer. He played in four first-class matches for Canterbury from 1936 to 1941.

Mapplebeck was a fast-medium bowler who took 6 for 43 in the first innings in his debut match against Otago in the 1936-37 Plunket Shield. However, he did not play again until the 1940–41 season, when he played his other three matches. In his last match, against Wellington, he took 5 for 59 in the first innings.

He served overseas as an officer in the Royal New Zealand Naval Volunteer Reserve in the Second World War.

See also
 List of Canterbury representative cricketers

References

External links
 

1914 births
1992 deaths
New Zealand cricketers
Canterbury cricketers
Cricketers from Christchurch
Royal New Zealand Navy personnel of World War II